Cnap Twt is a Site of Special Scientific Interest in the Vale of Glamorgan, south Wales. Located roughly three miles south of Bridgend near St Brides Major. This former disused quarry is of national importance as a site of fossil plant remains.

See also
List of Sites of Special Scientific Interest in Mid & South Glamorgan

Sites of Special Scientific Interest in Mid & South Glamorgan
Geography of the Vale of Glamorgan